Twan Huys (born 24 March 1964) is a Dutch journalist, television presenter and author. He is the presenter of the Dutch TV shows Nieuwsuur and College Tour. Previously, he worked as a correspondent and presenter for NOVA. The format of College Tour was conceived by Huys while working as a U.S. correspondent in New York City and Washington, D.C. from 1999 until 2007.

Early life and career 

Huys studied at the Academy for Journalism in Tilburg from 1983 until 1986, after which he went to work for the regional broadcasting company in the Dutch province of Limburg. He then worked for STAD Radio Amsterdam and VARA. From 1992 until September 2010, he worked for news program NOVA, and from that month onwards, he has worked for NOVA's successor, Nieuwsuur.

In 2018 he took over the talkshow RTL Late Night from Humberto Tan after declining views; he couldn't prevent its eventual cancellation and left after one season.

Books 
 (1994) In opdracht van Hare Majesteit (On behalf of Her Majesty)
 (2006) Ik ben een New Yorker (I am a New Yorker)
 (2009) Meesters (Masters)
 (2010) Over geluk (On happiness)
 (2013) Dertien meesters, één crimineel (Thirteen masters, one criminal)

References

External links 

 
 

1964 births
Living people
Dutch non-fiction writers
Dutch television presenters
Dutch television journalists
Dutch television news presenters
Dutch television talk show hosts
Dutch reporters and correspondents
People from Horst aan de Maas